Crystal Hot Sauce is a brand of Louisiana hot sauce produced by family-owned Baumer Foods since 1923.  of Crystal Hot Sauce are shipped per year to 75 countries. The sauce is reddish orange with medium heat, and has been described as having "a more prominent dark chile flavor, and a slightly subdued vinegar profile" when compared to Tabasco, another brand of Louisiana-style hot sauce.

History 
Originally based in New Orleans, Crystal was famous for its lighted sign featuring a chef stirring a pot of hot sauce with steam from the factory venting out through the pot. The sign was a New Orleans landmark on Tulane Avenue in Mid-City, visible from Interstate 10. The preserves advertised on the sign were found in U.S military rations during World War II, but are no longer produced.

Hurricane Katrina, which devastated the city in 2005, damaged much of Baumer Foods' New Orleans plant, including the sign. Following the storm, the company moved its plant to Reserve, in St. John the Baptist Parish, located up the Mississippi River from New Orleans. The iconic sign was replicated and placed atop a new apartment building, built on the same site as the old factory. As of April 2021, the company maintains its head office in Metairie, a suburb of New Orleans.

The green wrapper that sealed the bottle had the word Crystal written on it previously; after Hurricane Katrina the writing no longer appeared on the label.

Currently, the dark green over-wrap says both "Crystal" and "Louisiana" in white cursive letters.

Ingredients
The ingredient list on the product's packaging is: aged red cayenne peppers, distilled vinegar, salt.

In popular culture 
American chef David Chang has said that Crystal is his favorite hot sauce.

See also

 Cuisine of New Orleans
 Food production
 List of hot sauces

References

https://www.theadvocate.com/gambit/new_orleans/news/blake_pontchartrain/article_081c9c8f-c890-5f74-a4ed-c7009a69b4b7.html

External links

 Baumer Foods – Official website

Hot sauces
Brand name condiments
Louisiana cuisine
Products introduced in 1923
Food and drink companies of New Orleans
Manufacturing companies based in New Orleans